Glyphipterix oligastra is a species of sedge moths in the genus Glyphipterix. It was described by Edward Meyrick in 1926. It is found in Colombia.

References

Moths described in 1926
Glyphipterigidae
Moths of South America